Antoine d'Estrées (1529 – 11 May 1609) was Marquis of Coeuvres, vicomte of Soissons and of Bercy, Knight of the Order of Saint-Esprit in 1578 and Knight of the Order of Saint-Michel also in 1578. He was made gentleman of the chamber for Francis, Duke of Anjou, and later was made governor of several territories.

Biography 
Antoine was the son of Jean d'Estrées, Count of Orbec and Marquis of Cœuvres Catherine de Bourbon. He was born some time during 1529.

In 1558, he married Françoise Babou de La Bourdaisière and had at least nine children, the most famous being:
 Gabrielle d'Estrées
 François Annibal d'Estrées
 Julienne-Hippolyte-Joséphine d’Estrées
 Angélique d’Estrées

References

Sources

1529 births
1609 deaths
French diplomats
Members of the Académie Française
16th-century French people